Monomitopus agassizii is a fish species from the genus Monomitopus. It can be found in the Western Central Atlantic from the Caribbean sea all the way to the Gulf of Mexico. It has small scales, the upper jaw is enlarged, and with the exception of the gill membrane and lips, it's head is mostly covered with scales.

References 

Fish described in 1986
Ophidiidae